Michael Holt (born 1 February 1986) is a German former professional footballer who played as a striker.

Career
Holt began his career with SV Meppen, breaking into the first team in 2005. He scored on his debut on the opening day of the 2005–06 season, a 3–2 win over Eintracht Nordhorn. He scored ten goals in the Oberliga Nord in his first season, and was the club's top scorer the following year, with 19. He signed for Holstein Kiel in 2007, and immediately helped them win the Oberliga Nord, again as the club's top scorer with 22 goals.

Kiel were promoted to the Regionalliga Nord, but Holt missed much of the 2008–09 season due to injury. Despite this, he managed eight goals in 15 games, as the club won the title, and a second consecutive promotion. He made his 3. Liga debut in the second game of the 2009–10 season, as a substitute for Alexander Nouri in a 1–0 defeat to Wacker Burghausen. He ended the season with 14 goals, but this was not enough to prevent Kiel being relegated in 19th place.

Holt then left Kiel, joining the club that had finished below them, Wuppertaler SV. He spent one season with the Regionalliga West club, scoring 10 goals, before returning to SV Meppen, now in the Regionalliga Nord. After two years in which he was again the club's top scorer (with 11 and 12 goals respectively) he signed for Preußen Münster of the 3. Liga in July 2013. He joined SSVg Velbert on a six-month loan in January 2014.

External links

1986 births
Living people
German footballers
Association football forwards
SV Meppen players
Holstein Kiel players
Wuppertaler SV players
SC Preußen Münster players
SSVg Velbert players
Holstein Kiel II players
3. Liga players
Regionalliga players